Sulzer ZG9 was a pre-World War II opposed-piston two-stroke diesel engine by Sulzer. 
The engine was available with a choice of two, three and four cylinders (2ZG9, 3ZG9, 4ZG9); the two-cylinder version developed 120 bhp. It used a piston scavenge pump. This was mounted vertically above one rocker, driven by a bellcrank from the main rockers. This engine is sometimes cited as an inspiration for the Commer TS3 design.

Specification

See also  
 Arrol-Johnston - 1905 opposed piston petrol engine
 Commer TS3 
 Junkers Jumo 204 - an opposed-piston aircraft engine of the 1930s
 Napier Deltic - large multi-bank engine, with crankshafts shared between cylinder banks.

References 

Opposed piston engines
Two-stroke diesel engines
Diesel engines by model